Paolo Alfredo Quinteros (born January 15, 1979 in Colón, Entre Ríos, Argentina) is an Argentine-Italian professional basketball player. He plays mainly at the shooting guard position, but he can also play at the point guard position. He is 1.90 m (6' 2") tall, and he weighs 200 pounds.

Professional career
Quinteros began his professional career in the Argentine 2nd Division with Club Parque Sur in 1996. He then joined the top Argentine League club La Unión in 1997. He then moved to the Argentine League club Estudiantes Olavarria in 2000. In 2002, he moved to the Uruguayan League team Club Trouville in Montevideo.

He then returned to the Argentine League to play with the Boca Juniors in 2003. He joined León Caja España of the Spanish Second Division in 2006. He moved to Basket Zaragoza 2002 of the Spanish Second Division in the year 2007.

Quinteros was named the South American Club Championship MVP in 2004, and the Spanish Prince's Cup (Spanish 2nd level Cup) MVP in 2007. He played in the top-tier level division of Spain, the Spanish ACB League, for the first time, in the 2008–09 season.

National team career
Quinteros is also a member of the senior men's Argentine national basketball team. With Argentina's senior national team, he won silver medals at both the 2005 FIBA AmeriCup and the 2007 FIBA AmeriCup. He also won bronze medals at both the 2008 Summer Olympic Games and the 2009 FIBA AmeriCup.

He also won the gold medal at the 2011 FIBA AmeriCup.

Awards and accomplishments

Pro career
2× FIBA South American League Champion: (2001, 2012)
3× Argentine League Champion: (2001, 2004, 2013)
2× Argentine League Triples Tournament Champion: (2002, 2006)
2× Torneo Top 4: Winner (2002, 2004)
3× South American Club Championship Champion: (2004, 2005, 2006)
South American Club Championship MVP: (2004)
3× Argentine Cup Winner: (2004, 2005, 2006)
2× Argentine League All-Star Game MVP: (2005, 2012)
4× Argentine League Best Quintet: (2005, 2006, 2013, 2014)
Argentine League Top Scorer: (2005)
Spanish Prince's Cup (Spanish 2nd Cup) Winner: (2007)
Spanish Prince's Cup (Spanish 2nd Cup) MVP: (2007)
2× Spanish Second Division Champion: (2008, 2010)
Super 8 Tournament Champion: (2012)
Super 8 Tournament Top Scorer: (2012)
Super 8 Tournament MVP: (2012)
FIBA South American League MVP: (2012)
Argentine League MVP: (2013)
Argentine League Finals MVP: (2013)

Argentine senior national team
2003 FIBA South American Championship: 
2005 FIBA Mini World Cup: 
2005 FIBA AmeriCup: 
2006 FIBA South American Championship: 
2007 FIBA AmeriCup: 
2008 FIBA South American Championship: 
2008 FIBA Diamond Ball: 
2008 Summer Olympic Games: 
2009 FIBA AmeriCup: 
2011 FIBA AmeriCup:

External links
FIBA Profile
Eurobasket.com Profile
Spanish League Profile 

1979 births
Living people
Argentine emigrants to Italy
Argentine expatriate basketball people in Spain
Argentine men's basketball players
Baloncesto León players
Basketball players at the 2003 Pan American Games
Basketball players at the 2008 Summer Olympics
Basket Zaragoza players
Boca Juniors basketball players
Estudiantes de Olavarría basketball players
Italian expatriate basketball people in Spain
Italian men's basketball players
La Unión basketball players
Liga ACB players
Medalists at the 2008 Summer Olympics
Olympic basketball players of Argentina
Olympic bronze medalists for Argentina
Olympic medalists in basketball
Point guards
Shooting guards
2010 FIBA World Championship players
Pan American Games competitors for Argentina
Sportspeople from Entre Ríos Province